Kanwal Feroze is a Pakistani scholar, poet, writer and journalist. He was born in 1938 in Ferozpur, India, and migrated to Sargodha, Pakistan. He moved to Lahore in 1958 and has since been playing an important role in the literary activities of the city.

He is the Chief Editor of the monthly Urdu language journal Shadaab, which is an independent, socio-political and literary magazine which has specialized in minority issues and promoted inter-religious peace and harmony since 1969.

He holds a Ph.D. in Community Journalism.

In February 2005, he was honoured by the Pakistan Academy of Letters.

In 2009, he was awarded the Tamgha-i-Imtiaz (President's Medal of Excellence) in Literature by the Government of Pakistan. Feroz belonged to the Christian community.

His poetry has been published in four volumes:
Shahar-e- Saleeb-o-Gul – 1967
Shaakh-e-Shab-e-Wisaal - 1992
Shaam-e-Firat-e-Dil - 2002
Shafaq-e-Subh-e-Ghazal - 2009

References

Urdu-language non-fiction writers
Urdu-language poets from Pakistan
Pakistani Christians
1938 births
Living people